Three Words: An Anthology of Aotearoa/NZ Women's Comics is a 2016 collection that was edited by Rae Joyce, Sarah Laing, and Indira Neville. The book was first published on 14 March 2016 and collects together 64 female comic artists from New Zealand. Joyce stated that she wanted to create the collection after reading an anthology that was marketed as a history of New Zealand comics, only to feel that "it was representing the white male POV status quo rather than the reality of comics in NZ". She further commented that she hoped that Three Words would raise awareness for female comics from New Zealand, as she felt that they were under-represented.

The book received a review from Radio New Zealand.

Synopsis 
Three Words has comics by 64 female comic artists from New Zealand. Its title references the process of the creation of the content: all contributors chose three words for another contributor to use as a starting point for their comic. Submissions were also open to transgender people who identify as women, or who once identified as women.

The book includes contributions from Beth Ducklingmonster, Jessica Hansell, Rosemary McLeod, and Susan Te Kahurangi King, and features essays by Robyn Kenealy, Rae Joyce, Ruth Boyask, Jem Yoshioka and Miriam Sapphira. The editors welcomed submissions from women with all levels of experience in comics creation, and the finished work included established artists as well as newcomers to the field.

Contributors

Comics 

Adele Jackson
Alex McCrone
Alex Wild
Alice Tumblescribbleson
Alie McPherson
Andra Jenkin
Anna Crichton
Bek Coogan
Beth Dawson / Ducklingmonster
Beth Sometimes
Caroline Anderson
Celia Allison
Claire Harris
Dawn Tuffery
Debra Boyask
Demarnia Lloyd
Diane Rimmer
Elsie Jolliffe
Emma Blackett
Erin Fae
Giselle Clarkson
Indira Neville
Jem Yoshioka
Jessica Dew
Jessica Hansell / Coco Solid
Joanna Anderson
Judy Darragh
Kayla Oliver
Kerry Ann Lee
Lauren Marriott / Ralphi
Linda Lew
Lisa Noble
Liz Mathews
Loux McLellan
Lucy Meyle
Maiangi Waitai
Margaret Silverwood
Marina Williams
Mary Tamblyn
Mengzhu Fu
Miriam Harris
Mirranda Burton
Olga Krause
Pritika Lal
Rachel Benefield
Rachel Shearer
Rae Joyce
Raewyn Alexander
Rebecca Hawkes
Renée Jones
Rosemary McLeod
Sally Bollinger
Sarah Laing
Sarah Lund
Sharon Murdoch
Sophie McMillan
Sophie Watson / Sophie Oiseau
Stella Corkery
Susan Rugg
Susan Te Kahurangi King
Suzanne Claessen
The Rabbid
Warsaw
Zoe Colling

Essays 

Jem Yoshioka
Miriam Sapphira
Rae Joyce
Robyn Kenealy
Ruth Boyask

References

External links 
 

New Zealand books
New Zealand comics titles